Kim Yoon-man (born 25 February 1973) is a former speed skater from South Korea. At the 1992 Winter Olympics, he won a silver medal in the 500 m. He was the first South Korean person to win a medal in the Winter Olympic Games.

Education 
 Korea University
 Uijeongbu High School

References

External links 
 
 
 
 

1973 births
Living people
South Korean male speed skaters
Olympic speed skaters of South Korea
Olympic silver medalists for South Korea
Olympic medalists in speed skating
Speed skaters at the 1992 Winter Olympics
Speed skaters at the 1994 Winter Olympics
Speed skaters at the 1998 Winter Olympics
Medalists at the 1992 Winter Olympics
Asian Games medalists in speed skating
Asian Games silver medalists for South Korea
Asian Games bronze medalists for South Korea
Speed skaters at the 1990 Asian Winter Games
Speed skaters at the 1996 Asian Winter Games
Medalists at the 1996 Asian Winter Games
Korea University alumni
World Sprint Speed Skating Championships medalists
20th-century South Korean people
21st-century South Korean people